The 2007 Wichita mayoral election took place on April 3, 2007, to elect the Mayor of Wichita, Kansas. The election was held concurrently with various other local elections, and was officially nonpartisan. It saw the election of Carl Brewer, who unseated incumbent mayor Carlos Mayans. Brewer was the first African American to be elected mayor of Wichita.

Results

Primary

General election

References

2007
2007 Kansas elections
2007 United States mayoral elections